Camrose is a city in central Alberta, Canada that is surrounded by Camrose County. Located along Highway 13 it had its beginnings as a railroad hub.

History 
The area around Camrose was first settled by Europeans around 1900. At that time the nearby settlement of Wetaskiwin was a major centre for pioneers; typically, it was the last stopping-off point before they set out in search of nearby land. The site that was to be Camrose was about a day's journey from Wetaskiwin along the railroad, which made it a popular place on the route of pioneers. Soon businessmen and other settlers arrived to stay. The settlers came primarily from Scandinavian countries, such as Norway and Sweden, and many settlers also came from the United States. At that time the settlement was known as the hamlet of Stoney Creek. In 1904, Stoney Creek began receiving mail service, its first businesses began to open, and its first Royal Canadian Mounted Police (RCMP) officer (Constable "Blue" Smith) arrived.

On May 4, 1905, the community was incorporated as the Village of Camrose. There is no factual evidence about the reason for the choice of the name Camrose, but it is generally thought that it was named after the Village of Camrose in Pembrokeshire, South Wales. On December 11, 1906, Camrose was incorporated as a town.

In 1906, Camrose opened its first newspaper, The Camrose Mail, which was replaced in 1908 by the Camrose Canadian, which was published until 2018. In March 1907 the town erected a building for town administration, which also held its first police and fire station. In May 1907, it spent $10,000 on its schoolhouse.   In October 1907 men from Alberta Government Telephones set up Camrose's first telephone exchange, and by 1908 about fifty residents had telephone access. 1911 saw the construction of Camrose's first power plant.

From 1905 to 1914, there was a great deal of railway construction in the Camrose area. Camrose became a bit of a railroad hub, sitting on railways that connected to Edmonton and Calgary, as well as many of the smaller towns in central Alberta, such as Vegreville, Stettler, Drumheller, and Wetaskiwin. By 1914, twelve passenger trains came through Camrose daily. In those days the growth of Camrose was strongly linked with the railway.

On June 26, 1912, the first building of the Camrose Lutheran College (known as Augustana University College from 1991 to 2004) was opened. Today the campus continues as the Augustana Faculty of the University of Alberta.

During World War II, the Camrose Fairgrounds were converted to an army training grounds. About ten H-Shaped huts were built, as were mess quarters, a medical building and a storehouse. Thousands of Canadian boys came to Camrose to receive their basic training.

Camrose became a city on January 1, 1955. By 1958, Camrose had converted the old post office into the new city hall. In 1954, however, Camrose had sold the old town hall to the federal government, so in the interim the city council met for almost three years in the hall of the local Methodist Church.

Camrose has continued to expand, even as the significance of the railroads waned. It is now stretching out along Highway 13, and is becoming a major stop for travellers along that road. With the advent of the Big Valley Jamboree in Camrose it has become even more oriented towards tourism and hospitality.

Camrose was host to an Alberta Music Camp for upwards of 40 years, named MusiCamrose, until it later changed to MusiCamp Alberta, now hosted in Red Deer. It celebrated its 50th anniversary in the summer of 2007. It was founded by Peterkin.

On October 26, 2005, a single lottery ticket worth $54,000,000 (the second largest in Canadian history) was sold in Camrose. The ticket belonged to 17 oil industry workers.

In August 2006, Camrose held a Founders Day when four men were inducted as founding fathers of Camrose.

Geography 
Highway 13 runs through its centre. Camrose is located in a transitory region of Alberta, between prairie and boreal forest, known as aspen parkland. It is a major economic centre for many small farming communities in the surrounding area. The Stoney Creek runs through the city and flows into the Battle River south of the city.

Climate 
Camrose has a humid continental climate (Köppen climate classification Dfb) and falls into the NRC Plant Hardiness Zone 3b. Summers are warm with moderate rainfall while winters can be long and cold.

Demographics 

The primary ancestries are Scandinavian (26.3%), German (25.6%), English (20.2%), Scottish (17.6%), Irish (14.4%), and Aboriginal (3.5%).

English is the first language of 90% of the population. About 2.1% of residents said German, 1.1% said Ukrainian, 1.0% said French, and 0.7% said Spanish was their first language. The next most common languages were Chinese and Dutch at 0.6% each, followed by Danish and Norwegian at 0.4% each, Swedish at 0.3%, and Lao at 0.2%.

The 2001 census found 85% of residents identified as Christian, while 14% had no religious affiliation. For specific denominations Statistics Canada found that 24% of residents identified as Roman Catholic, while 20% identified as Lutheran, and 19% identified with the United Church of Canada. Among the less numerous denominations, 4% identified as Anglican, and about 2% each identified as Baptist and Pentecostal.

Sports and recreation 
The Camrose Recreation Centre, a multi-purpose sporting facility, officially opened on September 28, 2007. The complex includes the 2,500 seat Encana Arena (home of the Camrose Kodiaks of the  AJHL and the Augustana Vikings of the ACAC), and the 300+ seat Border Paving arena. The facility also boasts a three lane fitness track, fitness centre, physiotherapy clinic, physiotherapy lab, children's play room, meeting rooms, offices, and food and beverage facilities. Attached to this facility is the Max McLean Arena (former home of the Viking Cup, the Vikings and the Kodiaks), as well as the Camrose Aquatic Centre and curling rink.

Other recreational facilities include the Camrose Community Centre (walking track and indoor soccer centre), spray park, Camrose Skate Park, Kinsmen Park (which includes tennis courts, three fastball fields, football field, beach volleyball courts, a 2.2 km walking path), and Rudy Swanson Park, home to various soccer facilities and recreational groups.

Camrose has a large urban trail system which winds through Stoney Creek Valley. The total trail length is approximately 10.2 km.

Camrose is also home to a wide variety of sports clubs including figure skating, baseball, football, fastball, hockey and swimming to name a few. The Camrose Ski Club, founded in 1911, is the oldest cross-country ski club in Canada, and has produced many elite level athletes including several Olympians.

Parks 
Camrose is known colloquially as the "Rose City" due to the large number of wild roses which grow in the surrounding parklands. Developed to withstand the Alberta climate, the Camrose Rose was introduced to the city in 1995. Local rose grower Jerry Twomey bred and patented this variety of rose to honour his birthplace. The variety may be seen on display at the Bill Fowler Centre.

 Jubilee Park is often used by the community, located in a valley and featuring barbecue shelters, a wandering stream and wide open space.
 Mirror Lake sits in the centre of the city. Once a reservoir for the electrical plants which powered the city, the man-made lake was later home to two species of swan: the trumpeter and the Polish mute. The City of Camrose provided a winter shelter to the clipped birds. These swans called Camrose home for over twenty years. In September 2019, City Council voted to end the swan program due primarily to ethical concerns of keeping wild animals confined for five to six months a year, as well as managing offspring and trading the birds every three years.
Mirror Lake Park is the focal point of the Camrose urban parks system. Located on the edge of Mirror Lake, it is the home of the Bill Fowler Centre which contains the Chamber of Commerce office and the Tourist Information Centre. The Bill Fowler Centre features a nature mural, carved out of red brick. The mural features many of the animals which are indigenous to the Mirror Lake area.
 Mirror Lake flows from Stoney Creek, which wanders through the city, and provides a river valley for viewing wildlife through paved walking paths.

Government 
The current mayor in Camrose is PJ Stasko, and Malcolm Boyd is the city's manager. The Camrose City Council is made up of the mayor and eight elected councillors, all at large. The current MP is Damien Kurek, and the current MLA is Jackie Lovely.

Camrose Police Service 
The Camrose Police Service (CPS) is the municipal law enforcement agency for the City of Camrose. Planning for Camrose's first municipal police service began in 1955 after incorporating as a city. The CPS officially began operating on July 1, 1956 with Howard Martin serving as its first chief of police. Its current chief of police is Dean LaGrange.

Infrastructure 
Camrose is served by Camrose Airport.

Camrose's water supply comes from nearby Driedmeat Lake.

Education

Secondary 
Three authorities provide secondary schooling in Camrose, including the Battle River School Division (BRSD), Conseil Scolaire Centre-Nord (CSCN) and Elk Island Catholic Schools (EICS). The BRSD operates 37 schools in Camrose and the surrounding area. EICS operates one elementary school (St. Patrick Catholic School) and one junior/senior high-school (Our Lady of Mount Pleasant Catholic School).

Post-secondary 
The primary post-secondary institution in Camrose is the Augustana Faculty of the University of Alberta (formerly known as Augustana University College). Established in 1910 by Norwegian settlers, under the name Camrose Lutheran College.

In 2006, the university celebrated its first fourth generation graduate.

Camrose also hosts the Canadian Lutheran Bible Institute, and formerly Gardner College (previously known as Gardner Bible College and Alberta Bible Institute).

Media 
Camrose is served by two local papers. Formerly, the weekly Camrose Canadian, was published up until August 9, 2018 when its parent company announced that it was ceasing production.  The weekly Camrose Booster and the small daily, Camrose Morning News. There is also a local Christian paper published monthly called "Crosswalk".

Camrose is also home to two radio stations. The first is AM station 840 CFCW. Despite having a studio in West Edmonton Mall, CFCW still has its main broadcast studio in Camrose.

The second station is the much-newer FM station, New Country 98.1. Both stations are owned by Stingray Radio.

Sister cities 
The City of Camrose has twinning agreements with several similar communities in Canada and around the world. These relationships are developed in part with a mind toward promoting goodwill, education, economic and tourist benefits.

 Kamifurano, Hokkaido, Japan – 1984
 Warwick, Queensland, Australia – 1974
 Saguenay, Quebec, Canada (formerly Chicoutimi) – 1978
 Kentville, Nova Scotia, Canada – 1980

Notable people 
Tyler Bouck, retired professional hockey player
Scott Ferguson, retired professional hockey player
Josh Green, retired professional hockey player
Brennan Evans, former professional hockey player
Deena Hinshaw, deputy Provincial Health Officer of British Columbia, former Alberta Chief Medical Officer
Kenneth E. Iverson (1920–2004), computer scientist
Karl Stollery, professional hockey player
Verlyn Olson, member of the Alberta Legislature from 2008 to 2015
Parker Kelly, professional hockey player
Justin Kirkland, professional hockey player

References

Further reading

External links 

 
1905 establishments in Alberta
Cities in Alberta
Populated places established in 1905